Lakeline may refer to:
Lakeline, Ohio
Lakeline Mall
Lakeline (Capital MetroRail station)